The 2022–23 Tercera Federación season will be the second for Tercera Federación, the national fifth level in the Spanish football league system. It will consist of 18 groups with 16 teams each.

Competition format
The group champions will be promoted to 2023–24 Segunda Federación.
The champion of each group will qualify for 2023–24 Copa del Rey. If the champion is a reserve team, the first non-reserve team qualified will join the Copa.
Relegations to the regional leagues may depend on which clubs are relegated in the 2022–23 Segunda Federación, as well as the number of the promoted teams for the ensuing season.

Overview before the season
A total of 288 teams made up the league: 27 relegated from the 2021–22 Segunda División RFEF, 203 retained from the 2021–22 Tercera División RFEF, and 58 promoted from the regional divisions.

Groups

Group 1 – Galicia

Teams retained from 2021–22 Tercera División RFEF

 Alondras
 Arzúa
 Barco
 Choco
 Estradense
 Deportivo Fabril
 Racing Vilalbés
 Rápido Bouzas
 Silva
 Somozas
 Viveiro

Teams relegated from 2021–22 Segunda División RFEF

 Arosa

Teams promoted from 2021–22 Preferente de Galicia

 Atlético Arteixo
 Gran Peña
 Ourense
 Paiosaco

Teams and locations

League table

Group 2 – Asturias
Teams retained from 2021–22 Tercera División RFEF

 Caudal
 Colunga
 Covadonga
 L'Entregu
 Lealtad
 Llanes
 Luarca
 Praviano
 Sporting Gijón B
 Titánico
 Tuilla

Teams relegated from 2021–22 Segunda División RFEF

 Ceares
 Llanera

Teams promoted from 2021–22 Regional Preferente

 Avilés Stadium
 Condal
 Valdesoto

Teams and locations

League table

Group 3 – Cantabria
Teams retained from 2021–22 Tercera División RFEF

 Atlético Albericia
 Cartes
 Castro
 Escobedo
 Guarnizo
 Naval
 Sámano
 Siete Villas
 Textil Escudo
 Torina
 Vimenor

Teams relegated from 2021–22 Segunda División RFEF

Cayón
Tropezón

Teams promoted from 2021–22 Regional Preferente

 Gama
 Revilla
 Solares-Medio Cudeyo

Teams and locations

League table

Group 4 – Basque Country
Teams retained from 2021–22 Tercera División RFEF

 Anaitasuna
 Aurrerá Ondarroa
 Barakaldo
 Basconia
 Cultural Durango
 Deusto
 Lagun Onak
 Leioa
 Pasaia
 Portugalete
 San Ignacio
 Urduliz
 Vitoria

Teams promoted from 2021–22 División de Honor

 Aurrerá Vitoria
 Padura
 Touring

Teams and locations

League table

Group 5 – Catalonia

Teams retained from 2021–22 Tercera División RFEF

 Castelldefels
 Girona B
 Grama
 L'Hospitalet
 Pobla Mafumet
 Peralada
 San Cristóbal
 Sant Andreu
 Sants 
 Vilafranca
 Vilassar de Mar

Teams relegated from 2021–22 Segunda División RFEF

 Badalona
 Europa

Teams promoted from 2021–22 Primera Catalana

 Montañesa
 Rapitenca
 Tona

Teams and locations

League table

Group 6 – Valencian Community

Teams retained from 2021–22 Tercera División RFEF

 Acero
 Athletic Torrellano
 Atzeneta
 Castellón B
 Elche Ilicitano
 Hércules B
 Jove Español
 Orihuela
 Roda
 Silla
 Torrent
 Villarreal C

Teams relegated from 2021–22 Segunda División RFEF

 Atlético Levante

Teams promoted from 2021–22 Regional Preferente

 Gandía
 Patacona
 Rayo Ibense

Teams and locations

League table

Group 7 – Community of Madrid

Teams retained from 2021–22 Tercera División RFEF

 Alcalá
 Fuenlabrada Promesas
 Galapagar
 Getafe B
 Las Rozas
 Paracuellos Antamira
 Pozuelo de Alarcón
 Rayo Vallecano B
 Torrejón
 Trival Valderas
 Ursaria

Teams relegated from 2021–22 Segunda División RFEF

 Móstoles URJC

Teams promoted from 2021–22 Preferente de Madrid

 Canillas
 Collado Villalba
 Real Aranjuez
 RSC Internacional

Teams and locations

League table

Group 8 – Castile and León
Teams retained from 2021–22 Tercera División RFEF

 Almazán
 Arandina
 Atlético Astorga
 Atlético Bembibre
 Atlético Tordesillas
 Ávila
 Júpiter Leonés
 La Virgen del Camino
 Mirandés B
 Numancia B
 Palencia
 Santa Marta

Teams relegated from 2021–22 Segunda División RFEF

 Salamanca

Teams promoted from 2021–22 Primera Regional

 Becerril
 Ponferradina B
 Unami

Teams and locations

League table

Group 9 – Eastern Andalusia and Melilla
Teams retained from 2021–22 Tercera División RFEF

 Almería B
 Atlético Malagueño
 Atlético Porcuna
 Ciudad de Torredonjimeno
 El Palo
 Huétor Tájar
 Huétor Vega
 Jaén
 Marbella
 Motril
 Torre del Mar
 Torreperogil

Teams promoted from 2021–22 División de Honor

 Arenas
 Málaga City
 Maracena 

Teams promoted from 2021–22 Preferente de Melilla

 Huracán Melilla

Teams and locations

League table

Group 10 – Western Andalusia and Ceuta
Teams retained from 2021–22 Tercera División RFEF

 Atlético Antoniano
 Cartaya
 Ceuta B
 Ciudad de Lucena
 Conil
 Córdoba B
 Gerena
 Pozoblanco
 Puente Genil
 Rota
 Sevilla C
 Xerez

Teams promoted from 2021–22 División de Honor

 Atlético Espeleño
 Ayamonte
 Bollullos
 Coria

Teams and locations

League table

Group 11 – Balearic Islands
Teams retained from 2021–22 Tercera División RFEF

 Binissalem
 Collerense
 Constància
 Llosetense
 Manacor
 Mercadal
 Platges de Calvià
 Poblense
 Portmany
 PE Sant Jordi
 Santanyí
 Sóller

Teams relegated from 2021–22 Segunda División RFEF

 Andratx

Teams promoted from 2021–22 Regional

 Inter Manacor
 Penya Independent
 CE Sant Jordi

Teams and locations

League table

Group 12 – Canary Islands
Teams retained from 2021–22 Tercera División RFEF

 Arucas

 Gran Tarajal
 La Cuadra
 Lanzarote
 Marino
 Santa Úrsula
 Tenerife B
 Unión Sur Yaiza
 Villa de Santa Brígida

Teams relegated from 2021–22 Segunda División RFEF

 Las Palmas Atlético
 Mensajero
 Panadería Pulido
 San Fernando
 Tamaraceite

Teams promoted from 2021–22 Interinsular Preferente

 Estrella
 Ibarra

Teams and locations

League table

Group 13 – Region of Murcia
Teams retained from 2021–22 Tercera División RFEF

 Bullense
 Caravaca
 Ciudad de Murcia
 El Palmar
 La Unión Atlético
 Lorca Deportiva
 Minera
 Murcia Imperial
 Racing Murcia
 UCAM Murcia B

Teams relegated from 2021–22 Segunda División RFEF

 Águilas
 Atlético Pulpileño

Teams promoted from 2021–22 Preferente Autonómica

 Alcantarilla
 Cieza
 Muleño
 Unión Molinense

Teams and locations

League table

Group 14 – Extremadura
Teams retained from 2021–22 Tercera División RFEF

 Arroyo
 Azuaga
 Calamonte
 Don Álvaro
 Jerez
 Llerenense
 Miajadas
 Moralo
 Olivenza
 Plasencia
 Trujillo
 Villafranca

Teams promoted from Regional Preferente

 Atlético Pueblonuevo
 Fuente de Cantos
 La Estrella
 Montehermoso

Teams and locations

League table

Group 15 – Navarre

Teams retained from 2021–22 Tercera División RFEF

 Avance
 Azkoyen
 Beti Onak
 Burladés
 Cantolagua
 Cortes
 Egüés
 Huarte
 Pamplona
 Subiza
 Txantrea

Teams relegated from 2021–22 Segunda División RFEF

 Ardoi
 Peña Sport

Teams promoted from 2021–22 Primera Autonómica

 Alesves
 Lagunak
 Oberena

Teams and locations

League table

Group 16 – La Rioja
Teams retained from 2021–22 Tercera División RFEF

 Agoncillo
 Anguiano
 Atlético Vianés
 Berceo
 Calahorra B
 Casalarreina
 Haro
 La Calzada
 Oyonesa
 River Ebro
 Varea
 Yagüe

Teams relegated from 2021–22 Segunda División RFEF

 Náxara

Teams promoted from 2021–22 Regional Preferente

 Peña Balsamaiso
 Comillas
 Racing Rioja B

Teams and locations

League table

Group 17 – Aragon

Teams retained from 2021–22 Tercera División RFEF

 Atlético Monzón
 Barbastro
 Binéfar
 Calamocha
 Cariñena
 Caspe
 Cuarte
 Épila
 Illueca
 Robres

Teams relegated from 2021–22 Segunda División RFEF

 Ejea
 Huesca B

Teams promoted from 2021–22 Regional Preferente

 Almudévar
 La Almunia
 Tamarite
 Utrillas

Teams and locations

League table

Group 18 – Castilla–La Mancha
Teams retained from 2021–22 Tercera División RFEF

 Azuqueca
 Conquense
 Illescas
 Manchego
 Quintanar del Rey
 Tarancón
 Torrijos
 Villacañas
 Villarrobledo
 Villarrubia

Teams relegated from 2021–22 Segunda División RFEF

 Calvo Sotelo Puertollano
 Marchamalo
 Toledo

Teams promoted from 2021–22 Primera Autonómica Preferente

 Atlético Tomelloso
 La Solana
 Talavera de la Reina B

Teams and locations

League table

See also
2022–23 La Liga
2022–23 Segunda División
2022–23 Primera Federación
2022–23 Segunda Federación

Notes

References

External links
Royal Spanish Football Federation website

 
Spain